Henrik Forsberg (born September 10, 1985) is a Finnish ice hockey defenceman. He is currently playing with KooKoo in the Finnish Liiga.

Forsberg made his SM-Liiga debut playing with JYP during the 2004–05 SM-liiga season.

References

External links

1985 births
Living people
Finnish ice hockey defencemen
HIFK (ice hockey) players
Hokki players
HPK players
KeuPa HT players
KooKoo players
Lukko players
Mikkelin Jukurit players
Sportspeople from Vaasa
SaiPa players
SaPKo players
Vaasan Sport players